The List of Hawker Sea Fury operators lists the counties and their air force units that have operated the aircraft:

Operators

Australia

Royal Australian Navy received about 50 ex-FAA Sea Furies during 1949 and 1950.
Royal Australian Navy - Fleet Air Arm
723 Squadron RAN
724 Squadron RAN
725 Squadron RAN
805 Squadron RAN
808 Squadron RAN
850 Squadron RAN

Burma
Burma received 18 ex-FAA Sea Fury FB.11s and three Sea Fury T.20s in 1958.
Burma Air Force

Canada

A total of 74 Sea Furies served in three different RCN units - two combat squadrons (803 and 883) and the RCN's fixed-wing training unit, VT 40.
The last Canadian military flight of the RCN Hawker Sea Fury type  was made by F/O Lynn Garrison at McCall Field, Calgary, Alberta 1 April 1958. The aircraft involved was 
WG-565 ferried to Calgary for use as an instructional airframe at the Provincial Institute of Technology and Arts.
Royal Canadian Navy - Royal Canadian Navy Fleet Air Arm
803 Squadron RCN in May 1951 redesignated 870 Squadron
883 Squadron RCN in May 1951 redesignated 871 Squadron
870 Squadron RCN in November 1952 redesignated VF-870
871 Squadron RCN in November 1952 redesignated VF-871
VF-870
VF-871
VT-40
VX-10

Cuba
Cuba operated 15 ex-FAA Sea Fury FB.11s and two Sea Fury T.20s ordered in 1958. Deliveries started the same year, and by 1959, all had been delivered.Most of them were destroyed in crashes or cannibalized, albeit the British never imposed an embargo, unlike the USA. By the time the Bay of Pigs invasion took place on 15 April 1961, five were airworthy but only three were confirmed to be in action during the hostilities. One was shot down by either the LAF (Liberation Air Force) or ship fire. Two aircraft are displayed in museums in Cuba today. Reports the LAF destroyed 3 Sea Furies on the ground during the Bay of Pigs initial assault, are totally false and erroneous. (George Farinas)

Egypt
Egypt ordered 12 Sea Furies in 1949, and they were delivered during the following two years.
Royal Egyptian Air Force

Germany
The Federal Republic of Germany bought eight ex-FAA Sea Fury T.20s during 1959-60. They were further modified in Germany for target-towing duties and served under contract to the Luftwaffe as target tugs.
Deutsche Luftfahrt Beratungsdienst

Iraq

Iraq ordered 30 de-navalized Fury F.1 fighter-bombers and five (later reduced to two) Fury T.52 trainers in December 1946; the first batch of nine aircraft arrived in Iraq in November 1947. 20 additional Fury F.1s were bought in 1951.
Iraqi Air Force
No. 1 Squadron Royal Iraqi Air Force
No. 4 Squadron Royal Iraqi Air Force
No. 7 Squadron Royal Iraqi Air Force

Morocco
Four Hawker Furies were donated by Iraq in 1961. However, the aircraft were found to be in a very poor condition, and they were never flown in Morocco (apart from a single test flight).
Royal Moroccan Air Force

Netherlands

The Royal Netherlands Navy purchased 10 Sea Fury F. Mk.50 for service on the escort carrier Karel Doorman (QH1). Additional 12 Sea Fury FB. Mk.60 were purchased, and as a third order 25 Sea Fury FB. Mk.51 were built under license by Fokker. Several aircraft served aboard the second Karel Doorman (R81). Dutch Sea Furies were finally replaced in 1957 by Hawker Sea Hawks.
Royal Netherlands Navy - Dutch Naval Aviation Service

Pakistan

Between 1949 and 1950 Pakistan purchased 87 brand new Sea Fury Mk.60s, five ex-FAA FB.11, the prototype F.2/43 Fury (NX802) and five newly built Sea Fury Mk.61 two seat trainers.
Pakistan Air Force
No. 5 Squadron "Falcons"
No. 9 Squadron "Griffins"
No. 14 Squadron "Tail Choppers"
No. 23 Squadron "Talons"

United Kingdom

Royal Navy - Fleet Air Arm
700 Naval Air Squadron
703 Naval Air Squadron
736 Naval Air Squadron
738 Naval Air Squadron
739 Naval Air Squadron
744 Naval Air Squadron
751 Naval Air Squadron
759 Naval Air Squadron
767 Naval Air Squadron
773 Naval Air Squadron
778 Naval Air Squadron
781 Naval Air Squadron
782 Naval Air Squadron
787 Naval Air Squadron
799 Naval Air Squadron
801 Naval Air Squadron
802 Naval Air Squadron
804 Naval Air Squadron
806 Naval Air Squadron
807 Naval Air Squadron
811 Naval Air Squadron
898 Naval Air Squadron

Royal Naval Volunteer Reserve
1830 Naval Air Squadron
1831 Naval Air Squadron
1832 Naval Air Squadron
1833 Naval Air Squadron
1834 Naval Air Squadron
1835 Naval Air Squadron
1836 Naval Air Squadron
1843 Naval Air Squadron

See also

Hawker Sea Fury

References

Citations

Bibliography

Hawker Sea Fury
Sea Fury
Hawker aircraft